Christopher Francis Patten, Baron Patten of Barnes,  (born 12 May 1944) is a British politician who was the 28th and last Governor of Hong Kong from 1992 to 1997 and Chairman of the Conservative Party from 1990 to 1992. He was made a life peer in 2005 and has been Chancellor of the University of Oxford since 2003. He is also the one of only two living former governors of Hong Kong with Sir David Wilson.

Raised in west London, Patten studied history at Balliol College, Oxford. Shortly after graduating in 1965, he began working for the Conservative Party. Patten was elected Member of Parliament for Bath in 1979. He was appointed Secretary of State for the Environment by Margaret Thatcher in 1989 as part of her third ministry, becoming responsible for implementation of the unpopular poll tax. On John Major's succession as Prime Minister in 1990, Patten became Chairman of the Conservative Party and Chancellor of the Duchy of Lancaster. As party chairman, he successfully orchestrated a surprise Conservative electoral victory in 1992, but lost his own seat.

Patten was then appointed the last governor of Hong Kong, to oversee the final years of British administration in the colony and prepare for its transfer to China in 1997. During his tenure, his government significantly expanded the territory's social welfare programmes and introduced democratic reforms to the electoral system.

Following his governorship, Patten led the Independent Commission on Policing for Northern Ireland, a major implementation step of the Northern Ireland peace process pursuant to the Good Friday Agreement from 1998 to 1999. He was European Commissioner for External Relations from 1999 to 2004 and Chairman of the BBC Trust from 2011 to 2014.

Early life 
Patten grew up in an Irish Catholic family in west London, the son of an unsuccessful music publisher whose forebears had come to England from County Roscommon, Ireland. Patten's father, Frank, a jazz-drummer turned popular-music publisher and his mother Joan sent him to a Catholic primary school, Our Lady of the Visitation, in Greenford, and later to the independent St Benedict's School in Ealing, west London, where he won an exhibition to read Modern History at Balliol College, Oxford.

After graduating with a second-class honours degree in 1965 and winning a Coolidge travelling scholarship to the US, Patten worked for the campaign of then-Republican New York Mayor John Lindsay, where he reported on the television performance of rival William F. Buckley Jr. He worked for the Conservative Party from 1966, first as desk officer and then director (from 1974 to 1979) of the Conservative Research Department.

Member of Parliament: 1979–1992 
Patten was the Conservative Party candidate for Lambeth Central at the February 1974 general election, but lost to the Labour Party candidate, Marcus Lipton. He was elected as the Member of Parliament for Bath in 1979, and served until he was unseated in 1992.

In government 
Patten was appointed Parliamentary Under-Secretary for the Northern Ireland Office in June 1983. He was promoted to be a Minister of State in the Department of Education and Science in September 1985, and was named Minister for Overseas Development at the Foreign and Commonwealth Office in September 1986.

In 1989, he was promoted to the Cabinet as Secretary of State for the Environment and became responsible for the unpopular Community Charge (or so-called "Poll Tax"). Though he robustly defended the policy at the time, in his 2006 book Not Quite the Diplomat (published in the United States as Cousins and Strangers: America, Britain and Europe in the New Century) he claims to have thought it was a mistake on Margaret Thatcher's part. He also introduced, and steered through Parliament, the major legislation that became the Environmental Protection Act 1990.

In 1990, John Major made Patten Chancellor of the Duchy of Lancaster and Chairman of the Conservative Party, with responsibility for organising the Conservative Party's re-election campaign for the upcoming general election. As party chairman, he was widely considered to be the main architect of the somewhat unexpected Conservative victory at the 1992 general election. However, he lost his marginal seat of Bath to the Liberal Democrat candidate Don Foster at that election. Patten's defeat was attributed to factors such as the Poll Tax.

Governor of Hong Kong: 1992–1997 
If Patten had been re-elected in 1992, sections of the media thought he would have been rewarded by appointment as Foreign Secretary, although in his autobiography John Major said that he would have made Patten Chancellor of the Exchequer.

Patten turned down offers of a new post and instead, in July 1992, he became the 28th and the last governor of Hong Kong until its transfer of sovereignty to China on 30 June 1997. He was given an official Chinese name, Pang Ding-hong, a name with an etymology based on the words "stability" and "calm; joyous; healthy". Unlike most previous Hong Kong governors, he was not a career diplomat from the UK Foreign Office although he was not the first former MP to become a governor of Hong Kong.

Patten's tenure faced several different challenges, as many in Hong Kong were still reeling from the Tiananmen Square massacre a few years earlier. However the general public regarded him positively. He took steps to get in touch with the people of the colony, and was known for his penchant for taking public strolls around Hong Kong as well as in the media limelight. Hong Kong nicknamed him Fat Pang, making him the only governor to have a widely recognised Chinese nickname.

In contrast to his predecessors, Patten decided not to wear the official Court uniform on formal occasions. Patten's approval rating in Hong Kong in April 1992 was 53% and ended his tenure with an approval rating of 59.7%.

Patten's most controversial actions in Hong Kong are related to the 1994 electoral reform. LegCo members returned in 1995 were originally to serve beyond the Handover, thereby providing institutional continuity across the transition of Hong Kong to the PRC. Beijing had expected that the use of functional constituencies with limited electorates would be used to elect this council, however Patten extended the definition of functional constituencies and thus virtually every Hong Konger was able to vote for the so-called indirectly elected members (see Politics of Hong Kong) of the Legislative Council.

The Legislative Council became a fully elected legislature for the first time in 1995 and extensively expanded its functions and organisations throughout the last years of colonial rule.

Patten's actions were strongly criticised by the pro-Beijing political parties of Hong Kong. Patten was also denounced by some Chinese media and politicians as the "whore of the East" and a "serpent", and was most famously called a "sinner who would be condemned for a thousand generations" by Lu Ping, the head of China's Hong Kong and Macau Affairs Office. The legislative council which was elected under Patten's governorship was dissolved upon the handover of Hong Kong to the PRC and replaced by a Provisional Legislative Council which did not have any democratic functions until elections were held under the previous rules in 1998.

At midnight Hong Kong Time 1 July 1997 (16:00 GMT, 30 June 1997), he sent the telegram: "I have relinquished the administration of this government. God Save The Queen. Patten." This marked the end of British rule in Hong Kong. After the handover ceremony he left the city, together with Prince Charles, on board the British royal yacht, HMY Britannia. Patten was noted to be in tears throughout the day, notably after his speech at Tamar. He has since commented that his governorship of Hong Kong was a happy time for him personally as he shared this experience with his wife and children.

Patten government 

|}

Post-governorship 
From 1998 to 1999, he chaired the Independent Commission on Policing for Northern Ireland, better known as the Patten Commission, which had been established in 1998 as part of the Belfast Agreement. On 9 September 1999, the Commission produced its report, entitled A New Beginning: Policing in Northern Ireland and popularly known as the Patten Report, which contained 175 symbolic and practical recommendations. This report led to the disbanding of the Royal Ulster Constabulary and establishment of the Police Service of Northern Ireland. He is the co-chair of International Crisis Group, overseeing many international operations. He is also a member of the Global Leadership Foundation, an organisation which works to promote good governance around the world. On 23 May 2005 he was appointed by Cadbury as a non-executive director.

European Commissioner: 1999–2004 

In 1999, he was appointed as one of the United Kingdom's two members to the European Commission as Commissioner for External Relations where he was responsible for the Union's development and co-operation programmes, as well as liaison with Javier Solana, the High Representative of the Common Foreign and Security Policy. He held this position within the Prodi Commission from 23 January 2000 until 22 November 2004. Patten oversaw many crises in the area of European foreign policy, most notably the failure of the European Union to come up with a common unified policy before the Iraq War in 2003. Although nominated for the post of President in the next Commission in 2004, he was unable to gain support from France and Germany.

According to information from WikiLeaks, Patten was in Moscow in April 2004 and had concluded EU–Russia ministerial consultations in Brussels. He considered that the EU had become overly dependent on Russian energy supplies, and should become more engaged with the countries of the Caucasus and Central Asia in order to diversify supplies.

Patten was the biggest proponent in the commission for Turkey's accession to the European Union.

According to information from the US Embassy in Brussels (published by WikiLeaks in November 2010): Patten said in April 2004 that Russian President Vladimir Putin has done a good job for Russia mainly due to high world energy prices, but he had serious doubts about the man's character. Cautioning that "I'm not saying that genes are determinant," Patten then reviewed the Putin family history – grandfather part of Lenin's special protection team; father a communist party apparatchik, and Putin himself decided at a young age to pursue a career in the KGB. "He seems a completely reasonable man when discussing the Middle East or energy policy, but when the conversation shifts to Chechnya or Islamic extremism, Putin's eyes turn to those of a killer."

University roles and elevation to the peerage 

Patten was Chancellor of Newcastle University from 1999 to 2009. In 2003, he was elected Chancellor of the University of Oxford.

In 2016, in the wake of a student movement to remove the statue of Cecil Rhodes from a college in Oxford, as had happened in South Africa, Patten said that Oxford students who did not like Cecil Rhodes should "think about being educated elsewhere".

On 11 January 2005 Patten was created a life peer as Baron Patten of Barnes, of Barnes in the London Borough of Richmond upon Thames.

Chairman of the BBC Trust: 2011–2014 
On the advice of the Conservative–Liberal Democrat coalition government led by Prime Minister David Cameron, Patten was appointed by the Queen-in-Council as Chairman of the BBC Trust, and he took office on 1 May 2011, in the place of Sir Michael Lyons whose contract was not renewed. During this time, Patten sat as a crossbencher.

BBC royal river pageant outside broadcast 
As Chairman of the BBC Trust, Patten joined the Prince of Wales and other members of the royal family in the royal box for the Queen's Diamond Jubilee Concert. It came, however, immediately in the wake of widespread criticism of the BBC's live outside-broadcast coverage of the Queen's Diamond Jubilee River Pageant on 3 June 2012, which was castigated in the press and was the subject of 1,830 formal complaints by viewers. Patten said afterwards the Royal Pageant had not been the BBC's "finest hour" and admitted that "The tone was wrong."

Resignation 

Patten submitted his letter of resignation as BBC Trust Chairman to the Secretary of State on 6 May 2014; citing health reasons following his heart bypass surgery on 28 April. BBC Trust Vice Chairman Diane Coyle took over as Acting Chairman until the appointment of a new chairman. He returned to sit with the Conservative party in the House of Lords in September of that year.

In May 2016, Patten said that the BBC has "lost some of its ambition" in its coverage of science, philosophy and history, and should "stretch" audiences more. Patten bemoaned the fact that much of the corporation's high-brow programming had been moved to BBC Four, the digital channel, and given low budgets that meant shows were "sometimes made with glue and string". In a speech on the future of the BBC, which he said was "one of this country's greatest institutions", Patten called on ministers to respect the "besieged" broadcaster's independence, and set in place measures to stop it becoming "the plaything of the government of the day".

On China 
In September 2020, he wrote that "Chinese Communist Party general secretary Xi Jinping's dictatorship is certainly thuggish. Consider its policies in Xinjiang. Many international lawyers argue that the incarceration of over one million Muslim Uighurs, forced sterilisation and abortion, and slave labour meet the UN definition of genocide." Patten said that Chinese company Huawei "is an agent of an unpleasant Chinese state."

Personal life 
Patten married Lavender Thornton, a barrister, on 11 September 1971. They have three daughters, including the actress Alice Patten.

On 29 September 2005, he published his memoirs, Not Quite the Diplomat: Home Truths About World Affairs. In October 2009, Patten was Chief Guest at The Doon School, a boarding school in Dehradun, India, which is a member of the United Kingdom's Headmasters' and Headmistresses' Conference.

Patten is a Catholic and oversaw Pope Benedict XVI's visit to the United Kingdom in September 2010. In 2010, The Tablet named him as one of Britain's most influential Catholics.

In February 2010, Patten was appointed President of Medical Aid for Palestinians, but he stepped down in June 2011.

In 2014 Pope Francis appointed Patten to head a body to advise the Vatican on media strategy and on how to handle the press, which he remained on until 2016.

In the media 
Patten was interviewed about the rise of Thatcherism for the 2006 BBC TV documentary series Tory! Tory! Tory!

Patten and his time in Hong Kong was the subject of the 5-part documentary series The Last Governor, which was filmed throughout his time in Hong Kong, including his arrival, key moments of his government such as the 1995 elections and his final day in office, ending as he departs Government House for the last time.

The 1996 Hong Kong parody film Bodyguards of the Last Governor, presents 'Christ Pattern' as the Governor of Hong Kong. In addition to the name, Pattern appears to be based heavily on Patten, matching his appearance, political affiliation (Conservative) and family (a wife and two daughters with him in Hong Kong). His role however is minor as the film depicts him being replaced with one month to go before the handover. He is portrayed by Noel Lester Rands.

Patten is portrayed the video game Hong Kong 97 as ordering Chin, an unspecified relative of Bruce Lee, to massacre the entire population of mainland China.

Honours 

In the 1998 New Year Honours, Queen Elizabeth II appointed him a Companion of Honour (CH).

In 2003 he was awarded an honorary LL.D. degree from the University of Bath. In September 2005 he was elected a Distinguished Honorary Fellow of Massey College in the University of Toronto (the only person so elected except for the Chancellor of the University of Cambridge and the University of Edinburgh, the Duke of Edinburgh) as well as receiving an honorary D.S.Litt. degree from the University of Trinity College, Toronto and an honorary D.Litt. degree from the University of Ulster. In March 2009, Patten received the title Doctor honoris causa by South East European University.

In November 2016 Patten was made a Commander of the Legion of Honour, and was presented with the award by the French Ambassador to the United Kingdom Sylvie Bermann at Kensington Palace Gardens.

Bibliography

Books

Critical studies and reviews of Patten's work
What next?

References

Bibliography

External links 

 
 Chris Patten's profile on BBC News website
 "History in Motion" Chris Patten's monthly op-ed commentary series for Project Syndicate.
 European Commissioner
 
 Still looking for trouble at (nearly) 60 – Jackie Ashley talks to Chris Patten
 His thought patterns (Biswadip Mitra talks to Chris Patten)
 Audio: Chris Patten in conversation on the BBC World Service discussion show The Forum
 Patten, who helped transform the RUC into the PSNI, on his Irishness, Catholicism and the wrench of Brexit
 Corpus of Political Speeches Free access to political speeches by Chris Patten and other politicians, developed by Hong Kong Baptist University Library

|-

|-

|-

|-

|-

|-

|-

|-

|-

|-

|-

|-

British European Commissioners
British Secretaries of State
British Secretaries of State for the Environment
1944 births
Living people
Alumni of Balliol College, Oxford
Chairmen of the BBC
Chairmen of the Conservative Party (UK)
Chancellors of the Duchy of Lancaster
Chancellors of the University of Oxford
Conservative Party (UK) life peers
Conservative Party (UK) MPs for English constituencies
Électricité de France people
English people of Irish descent
English Roman Catholics
Governors of Hong Kong
HK LegCo Members 1991–1995
Members of the Order of the Companions of Honour
Members of the Privy Council of the United Kingdom
Northern Ireland peace process
People associated with Newcastle University
People educated at St Benedict's School, Ealing
People from Barnes, London
People from Thornton-Cleveleys
Politics of Bath, Somerset
Commandeurs of the Légion d'honneur
Recipients of the Order of the Cross of Terra Mariana, 1st Class
Trustees of the British Broadcasting Corporation
UK MPs 1979–1983
UK MPs 1983–1987
UK MPs 1987–1992
20th-century Hong Kong people
Northern Ireland Office junior ministers
Life peers created by Elizabeth II